Choreutinula is a genus of springtails in the family Hypogastruridae. There are about five described species in Choreutinula.

Species
These five species belong to the genus Choreutinula:
 Choreutinula alpina Babenko in Babenko, Chernova, Potapov & Stebaeva, 1994 i c g
 Choreutinula gauquelini Gers & Deharveng, 1985 i c g
 Choreutinula inermis (Tullberg, 1871) i c g
 Choreutinula kulla Fjellberg, 2007 g
 Choreutinula nodiseta (Handschin, 1928) i c g
Data sources: i = ITIS, c = Catalogue of Life, g = GBIF, b = Bugguide.net

References

Further reading

 
 
 

Collembola
Springtail genera